Ou Chanrith (born 25 February, 1969) is a Cambodian politician. He is a member of the Cambodia National Rescue Party and he represents Kandal Province as its Member of Parliament (MP). He was a member of the Human Rights Party from 2007 to 2012.

References

1969 births
Living people
Cambodia National Rescue Party politicians
Human Rights Party (Cambodia) politicians
California State University, Fresno alumni
People from Takéo province